Tyson Jay Motsenbocker (born April 26, 1986) is an American songwriter and guitarist. He has released three studio albums, 2016's Letters to Lost Loves,  2020's Someday I'll Make It All Up to You, and 2022's Milk Teeth, all three with Tooth & Nail Records.

Early years and background
Tyson Jay Motsenbocker was born on April 26, 1986, in Wenatchee, Washington, while he was raised in Pullman, Washington, by his parents William "Bill" and Jeanne Motsenbocker. He has a sibling, Jaimie Motsenbocker. Motsenbocker is a graduate of Whitworth University in Spokane, Washington, where he graduated in 2009 with his baccalaureate in English. He now resides in San Diego, California.

Music history
His music recording career began in 2010, with the extended play, Until It Lands. The subsequent extended play, Rivers and Roads, was independently released in 2013. He released, Letters to Lost Loves, on March 4, 2016, with Tooth & Nail Records. Much of the content and songwriting for Letters to Lost Loves was created during a month long walk he took from his home in San Diego to the Golden Gate Bridge in San Francisco Motsenbocker followed up his debut album with two additional extended play albums in 2017, Almira and A Kind Invitation also with Tooth & Nail Records.

On February 14, 2020, he released his sophomore full-length album,  Someday I'll Make It All Up to You. 

On July 13, 2022, Tyson released "Carlo Rossi (Love in the Face of Great Danger", the first single off his third album Milk Teeth which was released September 23, 2022.

Discography
Studio albums
 Letters to Lost Loves (March 4, 2016)
 Someday I'll Make It All Up to You (February 14, 2020)
 Milk Teeth (September 23, 2022)

References

External links
 

1986 births
Living people
Singers from Washington (state)
Musicians from Spokane, Washington
People from San Diego
Singers from California
Songwriters from Washington (state)
Songwriters from California
Whitworth University alumni
21st-century American singers
21st-century American male singers
American male songwriters